Gracetown is the second studio album by the Australian indie rock band San Cisco. The album is titled after a small town in Western Australia. It was released on 6 March 2015. The album peaked at number 2 on the ARIA Chart.

The band toured through Australia and internationally in 2015 to promote the release of the album.

Track listing

Charts

Release history

References

2015 albums
San Cisco albums